Blanche Saunders (October 1, 1906 - December 8, 1964) was one of the first Americans to popularize dog training, publishing several books and conducting demonstrations in dog obedience.

Saunders graduated from Massachusetts Agricultural College with majors in animal husbandry and poultry raising. Helen Whitehouse Walker, who had at first hired Saunders as a kennel maid in 1934, convinced the American Kennel Club in 1936 that dog obedience was a competitive field, and the following year Walker and Saunders criss-crossed the United States in a 21' trailer with several dogs, making a 10,000-mile obedience‐teaching tour, giving lectures and dog obedience demonstrations at dog shows. Saunders later conducted demonstrations in Rockefeller Plaza, and also at Yankee Stadium for seven years.

Saunders was the first dog obedience instructor of the ASPCA in New York (1944-1961), and was training director for the Poodle Obedience Club of Greater New York, the Boxer Obedience Club of Westchester County and the Port Chester Obedience Club.

In 1946, Saunders published her first book, Training You to Train Your Dog. During her lifetime Saunders authored several books, many of which continued to be republished after her death.

Bibliography

 Dog Care and Training for Boys and Girls (1976)
 Dog Care for Boys and Girls (1969)
 Dog Training for Boys and Girls 
 Grooming and showing instructions (1958)
 How to Trim, Groom & Show Your Dog (Illustrated) (1968) 
 New Standard Book of Dog Care and Training: 1001 Questions Answered (1957) 
 The Blanche Saunders' Obedience Training Courses: Novice, Open, Utility, Tracking (1982) 
 The Complete Book of Dog Obedience: The Guide for Trainers (1977) 
 The Complete Novice Obedience Course: With Blanche Saunders' Guide to Dog Breeds (1969) 
 The Complete Novice Obedience Manual (1958) 
 The complete open obedience course (1969) 
 The Complete Open Obedience Course: How To Train Your Dog 
 The Complete Utility Obedience Course with Tracking (1961) 
 The Poodle Chart by Blanche Saunders; illus. by John LaPresle (1950) 
 The Story of Dog Obedience (1975) 
 Training You to Train Your Dog (1952)

References

1906 births
1964 deaths
People from Maine
Dog trainers
People from Aroostook County, Maine
Massachusetts Agricultural College alumni